The  is a railway line in eastern Aichi Prefecture, Japan, operated by the private railway operator Toyohashi Railroad ("Toyotetsu"). The line runs from the centre of Toyohashi, traversing the centre of the Atsumi Peninsula, a largely rural district noted also for its hot spring resorts and marine sports as part of Mikawa Wan Quasi-National Park. The line is entirely within the cities of Toyohashi and Tahara.

Basic data
 Line length: 
 Number of stations: 16
 Track: single
 Rail gauge:  
 Electrification: 1,500 V DC overhead
 Max speed: 
 Railway signalling: Automatic (ATS, compatible with Meitetsu)

Operation
The northern terminal station for the Atsumi Line is located at Shin-Toyohashi Station. All trains run to the southern terminus at Mikawa Tahara Station at approximately 15 minute intervals. There are no express trains on the line.

Station list

Rolling stock

, the line is operated using a fleet of ten three-car 1800 series electric multiple unit (EMU) trains. These trains were modified from former Tokyu 7200 series EMUs. All trains are configured for One-man operation.

Since 2013, the trains are each painted a different colour and carry the names of flowers, as follows.

History

On April 10, 1926, the now-defunct section of track from Mikawa Tahara to Kurokawahara was completed. Construction of a proposed extension to Fukue commenced in 1940, but was later abandoned due to material shortages in World War II.

On September 1, 1940, the Atsumi Electric Railway was merged into Nagoya Railway. Most of the stations on the line were closed on June 5, 1944, as an austerity measure. On October 1, 1954, the Toyohashi Railway was spun out from the Nagoya Railway as an independently operating subsidiary. Most of the closed stations were reopened by this time, but the section from Mikawa Tahara to Kurokawahara was closed permanently. Express train operations began from October 1, 1965. 

All freight operations were discontinued from February 1, 1984 and express train operations were discontinued from September 1, 1985. On July 2, 1997 the electrification system was upgraded to 1,500 V DC.

See also
List of railway lines in Japan

References
This article incorporates material from the corresponding article in the Japanese Wikipedia.

External links 

 Toyohashi Railroad official website 

Railway lines in Japan
Rail transport in Aichi Prefecture
1067 mm gauge railways in Japan